Ralph Grant "Lefty" Caldwell (January 18, 1884 – August 5, 1969) was an American pitcher in Major League Baseball. He was 5'9" and weighed 155 pounds.

Biography
Caldwell was born in Philadelphia, Pennsylvania, in 1884. He entered the University of Pennsylvania in 1902 and played on the school's baseball team in 1903 and 1904. He graduated in 1907.

Caldwell made his professional baseball debut for the National League's Philadelphia Phillies on September 10, 1904. In six appearances that season, he went 2–2 with a 4.17 earned run average. He also went 8 for 18 at the plate for a .444 batting average. The following season, he went 1–3 with a 4.24 ERA in seven appearances for the Phillies. He went 0 for 15 at the plate. His final major league game was on July 5, 1905. During the 1905 season, he also played for the Eastern League's Toronto Maple Leafs.

Caldwell died in West Trenton, New Jersey, in 1969 and was buried in Ewing Church Cemetery.

References

External links

1884 births
1969 deaths
Major League Baseball pitchers
Philadelphia Phillies players
Toronto Maple Leafs (International League) players
Lehigh Mountain Hawks baseball coaches
Baseball players from Philadelphia